The Maillard was a French automobile manufactured from 1900 until around 1903.  Two models, a 6 hp and a 10 hp, were available; they were upgraded to 8 hp and 12 hp in 1901.  Maillard vehicles were also built in Belgium under the name Aquilas.

References
 Wise, David Burgess. The New Illustrated Encyclopedia of Automobiles.

Defunct motor vehicle manufacturers of France